Rhomaleopakhus (meaning "strong forearm") is a genus of mamenchisaurid
sauropod, dinosaur from the Late Jurassic Kalaza Formation of China. The type and only species is Rhomaleopakhus turpanensis.

History 
The holotype IVPP-V11121-1, was found by a Chinese-Japanese Chunichi Shinibun expedition near Qiketai in Shanshan, Xinjiang province in 1993, along with the holotype of Hudiesaurus, and is a partially complete forelimb consisting of a humerus, ulna, radius, one carpal, and a partially complete manus that was originally assigned to the coeval mamenchisaurid Hudiesaurus. Paul Upchurch in 2004 rejected the identity because of a lack of overlapping material.  However, in a 2021 reassessment of the latter genus, the forelimb was separated from its hypodigm and named the holotype of a new genus and species, Rhomaleopakhus turpanensis; the specific name refers to the Turpan Basin where the specimen was collected.

Description 
Upchurch et al. note that the robustness of the forelimb, after which the taxon was named, convergently evolved in what are called the "Core Mamenchisaurus-like taxa" (CMTs) titanosaurs, and ceratopsids. They believe this correlates with a more flexed orientation of the forearm, an enhanced role of the forearm in feeding, and a more anterior shift in the center of mass. It is possible that CMTs and titanosaurs specialized in a feeding strategy that involved efficient locomotion between sparsely-located food sources.

Classification 
Upchurch et al. used Moore et al. (2020)'s phylogenetic analysis to determine the relationships of Rhomaleopakhus. They found it to be a mamenchisaurid sister to Chuanjiesaurus, in a clade that also includes Analong. Their cladogram is shown below:

References

Mamenchisaurids
Paleontology in Xinjiang
Late Jurassic dinosaurs of Asia
Fossil taxa described in 2021